Vicién is a municipality located in the province of Huesca, Aragon, Spain. According to the 2018 census (INE), the municipality has a population of 116 inhabitants.

Geography

Neighboring localities
Tribunals
Isuela taverns

Origin of the name Vicién
It is said  that "Vicién" comes from the Roman name of person or Vicentius Vicens.

References

Municipalities in the Province of Huesca